Mubarak Al-Amsari (born 25 June 1987) is a Saudi Arabian football player who plays as a midfielder for Al-Zulfi.

References

External links 
 

Living people
Association football midfielders
Saudi Arabian footballers
1987 births
Al-Wehda Club (Mecca) players
Al-Faisaly FC players
Al-Qadsiah FC players
Al-Fateh SC players
Al-Nahda Club (Saudi Arabia) players
Al-Jabalain FC players
Al-Adalah FC players
Bisha FC players
Al-Zulfi FC players
Saudi First Division League players
Saudi Professional League players
Saudi Second Division players